Cisaria Munich is a German Student Corps (Fraternity) in the Weinheimer Senioren-Convent (WSC), one of the oldest umbrella organizations of German fraternities. As a corps, Cisaria practices academic fencing and wears Colours. Its membership comprises students and alumni of LMU Munich, TU Munich and other Munich colleges and universities. Its members are called Cisaren. Cisaria is a member of the Münchener Senioren-Convent (MSC). As the oldest local WSC Corps, at present it also permanently presides the MWSC, the local union of Weinheimer Corps.

Coat of arms
The coat of arms of Corps Cisaria consists of four fields. The upper left one displays the city arms of Augsburg on red ground; the Roman numerals resemble the date the corps was founded. In the upper right corner the Zirkel (a kind of signature) of Cisaria is depicted. The lower left field shows a pair of crossed "Korbschläger" in front of the red-white-green colours. The letters i, v and h represent the motto of arms, in viturte honos. The last field, to the lower right,  displays colours and Zirkel of the former associate corps Normannia.

Couleur
Cisaria wears the colours red - white - green. The colours originate from the city arms of Augsburg. The colours of the Fuchs (pledge) are red - white. Cisaren also wear red caps.

Renowned Members
 Heinrich von Buz († 1918), industrialist and inventor
 Karl von Brug († 1923), Bavarian general and aviator
 Richard Schachner († 1936), architect, professor and headmaster of the Munich University of Technology
 Rudolf Nebel († 1978), rocket design engineer
 Otto Haxel († 1998), nuclear physicist

External links
 Corps Cisaria Munich (in german)

Corps Cisaria Munich
Student societies in Germany
1851 establishments in Germany
Student organizations established in 1851
Ludwig Maximilian University of Munich alumni
Technical University of Munich alumni
Bundeswehr University Munich alumni